The Columbia Valley Rockies are a junior "B" ice hockey team based in Invermere, British Columbia, Canada. They are members of the Eddie Mountain Division of the Kootenay Conference of the Kootenay International Junior Hockey League (KIJHL). The Rockies play their home games at Eddie Mountain Memorial Arena.

The Rockies joined the league in 1978 as an expansion team. In its KIJHL history, the team has won the Keystone Cup twice, in 1989 and 1990; the Cyclone Taylor Cup once, in 1989. The Rockies have won the KIJHL Championship three times, in 1988, 1989 and 1990. They won five division playoff titles as a member of the Eastern Division from 1978-1996 and three division playoff titles as a member of the Eddie Mountain Division from 1996-2012.

History

The team was founded by Eddie Mountain, of whom a KIJHL division was recently named. The team won three straight KIJHL Championships in the late 1980s and in 1989 took home the Cyclone Taylor Cup and the Keystone Cup under the direction of Tom Renney, who is currently an assistant coach of the Detroit Red Wings of the NHL.

Season-by-season record

Note: GP = Games played, W = Wins, L = Losses, T = Ties, OTL = Overtime Losses, Pts = Points, GF = Goals for, GA = Goals against

Records as of February 27, 2023.

Playoffs

Cyclone Taylor Cup

Keystone Cup

Alumni

Doug Barrault
 Taylor Dakers
Wade Dubielewicz
Cory Flett
 Marc Garthe
 Logan Koopmans
Jeff Lank
Riley Nelson
Jason Marshall
Tom Renney
Craig Stahl

Awards and trophies
Keystone Cup
1988-89
1989-90

Cyclone Taylor Cup
1988-89

KIJHL Championship
1987-88
1988-89
1989-90

Coach of the Year
Matt Hughes: 2005-06 (Divisional)

Most Sportsmanlike
Darryl Mcivor: 2003-04 (Divisional)
Cody Steele: 2005-06 (Divisional)
Cody Steele: 2006-07 (Divisional)
Tyler Nypower: 2017-18 (Divisional)

Most Valuable Player
Andrew Billinghurst: 2001-02 (Divisional)
Jason Botterill: 2002-03 (Divisional And League)
Reid Mitchell:2007-08, 2008-2009 (Team)
Ryan Skytt: 2016-17 (Team)

Rookie of the Year
Taylor Dakers: 2002-03 (Divisional)
Trevor Bailey: 2005-06 (Divisional)
Josh Antunes/Kale Hawryluk: 2017-18 (Team)

Top Goaltender
Taylor Dakers: 2002-03 (Divisional)
Tyler Bilton: 2003-04 (Divisional)

Playoff MVP
Ben Kelsch/Ryan Skytt: 2017-18 (Team)Top Scorer
Rocky Mix: 2002-03 (Divisional)
Brett Bjorkman: 2007-08 (Divisional)

Heart and Hustle
Brandt Black/Fraser McMann 2017-18: (Team)

Coaches Choice
Brennan Nelson 2017-18: (Team)

Most Improved
Hunter Beckett: 2017-18 (Team)

Community Involvement
Brandt Black: 2017-18 (Team)

Top Defenceman
Kale Hawryluk: 2017-18 (Team)

Top Defensive Forward
Brennan Nelson: 2017-18 (Team)

Top Forward
Mike Dyck 2016-17: (Team)

References

External links
 Official website of the Columbia Valley Rockies

Ice hockey teams in British Columbia
1978 establishments in British Columbia
Ice hockey clubs established in 1978